Mr. Monk Helps Himself is the sixteenth novel based on the television series Monk. It was published on June 4, 2013. Like the other novels, the story is narrated by Natalie Teeger, Monk's assistant. It is the first novel in the series to be written by Hy Conrad.

Plot summary
Adrian Monk decides that it is time for Natalie Teeger to become a private detective to better aid him when solving cases.  However, they come to a disagreement when Natalie wants to take the case of a woman whose apparent suicide starts to look like murder and Monk is more interested in a clown killed by poisoned money.

List of characters

Characters from the television series
Adrian Monk: The titular detective, played in the series by Tony Shalhoub
Natalie Teeger: Monk's loyal assistant and the narrator of the book, played on the series by Traylor Howard

References

2013 American novels
Monk (novel series)
Signet Books books